The 2010 British Athletics Championships was the national championship in outdoor track and field for athletes in the United Kingdom, held from 25–27 June at Alexander Stadium in Birmingham. It was organised by UK Athletics. It served as a selection meeting for Great Britain at the 2010 European Athletics Championships.

Results

Men

Women

References 

Aviva European Trials and UK Championships. Power of 10. Retrieved 2020-01-25.
2010 British Athletics Championships. UK Athletics. Retrieved 2020-01-25.

External links
British Athletics website

British Outdoor Championships
British Athletics Championships
Athletics Outdoor
British Athletics Championships
Sports competitions in Birmingham, West Midlands
2010s in Birmingham, West Midlands